The ceremonial county of Somerset consists of a non-metropolitan county, administered by Somerset County Council, which is divided into five districts, and two unitary authorities. The districts of Somerset are West Somerset, South Somerset, Taunton Deane, Mendip and Sedgemoor. The two administratively independent unitary authorities, which were established on 1 April 1996 following the breakup of the County of Avon, are North Somerset and Bath and North East Somerset. These unitary authorities include areas that were once part of Somerset before the creation of Avon in 1974.

Local nature reserves (LNRs) are designated by local authorities under the National Parks and Access to the Countryside Act 1949. The local authority must have a legal control over the site, by owning or leasing it or having an agreement with the owner. LNRs are sites which have a special local interest either biologically or geologically, and local authorities have a duty to care for them. They can apply local bye-laws to manage and protect LNRs.

There are 40 local nature reserves in Somerset recognised by Natural England. This provides a habitat for grey wagtail, dipper and reed bunting. The largest, covering , is Weston Woods on Worlebury Hill,  which includes Worlebury Camp Iron Age hill fort. The woodland provides a habitat for mammals including deer, badgers, foxes and bats. Birds include woodpeckers, buzzards and treecreepers. Several of the sites are Sites of Special Scientific Interest (SSSI). The list includes sites owned or managed by both Avon Wildlife Trust and Somerset Wildlife Trust.

Sites

See also
List of national nature reserves in Somerset
List of local nature reserves in England
List of Sites of Special Scientific Interest in Somerset

Notes

References

 
Somerset